Senator Feldman may refer to:

Brian Feldman (politician) (born 1961), Maryland State Senate
Dede Feldman (born 1947), New Mexico State Senate
Matthew Feldman (1919–1994), New Jersey State Senate